In the geometry of numbers, Schinzel's theorem is the following statement:

It was originally proved by and named after Andrzej Schinzel.

Proof 

Schinzel proved this theorem by the following construction.

This circle has radius , and is centered at the point . For instance, the figure shows a circle with radius  through four integer points.

As an equation of integers,  is writing  as a sum of two squares, where the first is odd and the second is even. There are exactly  ways to write  as a sum of two squares, and half are in the order (odd, even) by symmetry.

This circle has radius , and is centered at the point .

Properties 

The circles generated by Schinzel's construction are not the smallest possible circles passing through the given number of integer points, but they have the advantage that they are described by an explicit equation.

References

Theorems about circles
Geometry of numbers